was a Japanese video game developer based in Machida, Tokyo, and a subsidiary of Nippon Ichi Software. The company was founded on December 2, 1996. FOG is best known for developing visual novels.

History
FOG Inc. was founded on December 2, 1996 in Sakuragaoka-chō, Shibuya, Tokyo. In April 1999 the company was relocated to Shin-Yokohama, in August 2009 to Kōhoku Newtown, Tsuzuki-ku, Yokohama, and in June 2012 to Machida, Tokyo. In February 2006 the company's president Noriyuki Sōsei passed away. In April 2016 Nippon Ichi Software acquired FOG. The company closed in December 2021

Games by FOG
  (August 7, 1997, PlayStation)
  (December 3, 1998, PlayStation)
 Kuon no Kizuna: Sairinsho (May 18, 2000, Dreamcast)
  (January 18, 2001, PlayStation)
  Part 1 (January 17, 2002, Dreamcast)
 Kuon no Kizuna: Sairinsho (July 18, 2002, PlayStation 2)
 Missing Parts: The Tantei Stories Part 2 (October 24, 2002, Dreamcast)
 Missing Parts: The Tantei Stories Part 3 (July 31, 2003, Dreamcast)
 Missing Parts: The Tantei Stories Side A (November 27, 2003, PlayStation 2)
 Missing Parts: The Tantei Stories Side B (February 19, 2004, PlayStation 2)
  (January 27, 2005, PlayStation 2)
  (November 10, 2005, PlayStation 2)
 Fuuraiki (September 28, 2006, PlayStation 2)
  (March 8, 2007, PlayStation 2)
  (March 6, 2008, PlayStation 2)
 Musō Tōrō (March 19, 2009, PlayStation Portable)
 Amagōshi no Yakata Portable: Ichiyanagi Nagomu, Saisho no Junan (September 17, 2009, PlayStation Portable)
 Naraku no Shiro Portable: Ichiyanagi Nagomu, Nidome no Junan (December 17, 2009, PlayStation Portable)
  (February 25, 2010, PlayStation Portable)
 Missing Parts: The Tantei Stories Complete (November 29, 2012, PlayStation Portable)
  (March 29, 2013, Microsoft Windows)
  (May 31, 2013, Microsoft Windows)
 Fuuraiki 3 (February 19, 2015, PlayStation Vita)
  (July 8, 2021, Nintendo Switch, PlayStation 4)

References

External links
 FOG Inc. on Nippon Ichi Software's website 
  

Japanese companies established in 1996
Video game companies established in 1996
Nippon Ichi Software
Defunct video game companies of Japan
Video game development companies
2016 mergers and acquisitions
Software companies based in Tokyo
Machida, Tokyo